Hans Olden (1892–1975) was an Austrian stage and film actor. Olden appeared in more than eighty films during his career, mostly in Austria but occasionally also in Germany. He was a supporter of the Austrian Nazi Party, his interest in Nazism pre-dating the Anchluss by some years. After the Second World War Olden appeared in a number of Heimat films.

Selected filmography
 Irene in Trouble (1932)
 Gently My Songs Entreat (1933)
 Catherine the Last (1936)
 An Orphan Boy of Vienna (1936)
 Diamonds (1937)
 Such Great Foolishness (1937)
 Der singende Tor (1939)
 Linen for Ireland (1939)
 Men Are That Way (1939)
 Vienna Tales (1940)
 My Daughter Lives in Vienna (1940)
 Love is Duty Free (1941)
 Two Happy People (1943)
 The White Dream (1943)
 Music in Salzburg (1944)
 The Heavenly Waltz (1948)
 We've Just Got Married (1949)
 Two Times Lotte (1950)
 A Rare Lover (1950)
 Kissing Is No Sin (1950)
 The Colourful Dream (1952)
 Knall and Fall as Imposters  (1952)
 The Immortal Vagabond (1953)
 A Night in Venice (1953)
 Open Your Window (1953)
 Irene in Trouble (1953)
 Money from the Air (1954)
 The Big Star Parade (1954)
 Sarajevo (1955)
 Royal Hunt in Ischl (1955)
 Yes, Yes, Love in Tyrol (1955)
 Three Men in the Snow (1955)
 Emperor's Ball (1956)
 Charley's Aunt (1956)
 The Simple Girl (1957)
 The Count of Luxemburg (1957)
 Mikosch, the Pride of the Company (1958)
 Love, Girls and Soldiers (1958)
 Mikosch of the Secret Service (1959)
 La Paloma (1959)

References

Bibliography 
 Fritsche, Maria. Homemade Men In Postwar Austrian Cinema: Nationhood, Genre and Masculinity. Berghahn Books, 2013.

External links 
 

1892 births
1975 deaths
Austrian male stage actors
Austrian male film actors
Male actors from Vienna
20th-century Austrian male actors